Meldon is a village in Northumberland, England. It lies to the west of Morpeth.  The population of Meldon as taken at the 2001 Census was 162, increasing to 242 at the 2011 Census.

Notes

External links

GENUKI: Meldon, Northumberland Genealogy

Villages in Northumberland
Civil parishes in Northumberland